Winnie or Winny is a male and female given name of Welsh origin, a short form (hypocorism) of Edwina, Winona, Winifred or Winnifred, Winter, Gwendolyn, Guinevere (Welsh), Gwyneth (Welsh), and Wynne (Welsh). The name's meaning is: fair one, white and smooth, soft, happiness, or fair and pure. The popularity of the name Winnie steadily declined among American women in the 20th century, but in the 1990 US Census, still ranked 699th of 4276. Some commentators note that the name has risen in use for girls along with other names of a similar style that all exude cuteness and promote enjoyment, perhaps in reaction to serious times.

It is also a male name from Cambodia (meaning bright), or a short form of the English given name Winston. It can derive from many other names ending in -win such as Edwin, Darwin, etc., or be a nickname for the Welsh name Wyn.

People 
 Varina Anne Davis (1864–1898), called Winnie, author and daughter of Confederate President Jefferson Davis
 Winnie Baze (1914–2006), American football player
 Winnie Cordero (born 1966), Filipina comedian, actress, and TV host
 Winnie Ewing (born 1929), Scottish nationalist
 Winnie Haatrecht (born 1963), Dutch-Surinamese retired footballer and currently a player's agent
 Winnie Harlow (born 1994), Canadian model and spokesperson on the skin condition vitiligo
 Winnie Holzman (born 1954), American dramatist, screenwriter and poet
 Winne Hung (born 1999), Hong Kong rower
 Winny de Jong (born 1958), Dutch politician
 Winnie Ruth Judd (1905–1998), American convicted double murderer
 Winnie Kiap, diplomat from Papua New Guinea 
 Luamanuvao Winnie Laban (born 1955), New Zealand politician 
 Winnie Leuszler (1926–2004), Canadian swimmer
 Winnie Lightner (1899–1971), American film actress
 Winnie Madikizela-Mandela (1936–2018), South African anti-apartheid activist, politician, and ex-wife of former South African president Nelson Mandela
 Winnie Shaw (1947–1992), Scottish tennis player
 Winnie Wong-Ng, Chinese-American physical chemist
 Winnie Yu (born 1954), Cantonese radio director

Fictional characters
Winnie-the-Pooh or Winnie the Pooh, an anthropomorphic fictional bear created by A. A. Milne 
Gwendolyn "Winnie" Cooper, a main character from the American television series The Wonder Years
Winifred "Winnie" Foster, a main character from the American book and movie Tuck Everlasting
Winnie Oh, a teacher in Degrassi
Winnie Tibideaux, Sondra and Elvin's daughter on the American television series The Cosby Show
the title character of Winnie Winkle, an American comic strip published from 1920 to 1996
Winnie Woodpecker, the girlfriend of animated cartoon character Woody Woodpecker
 Winnie, a kid werewolf in the movies Hotel Transylvania and Hotel Transylvania 2
Winnie Mann, Helena Peabody's former partner in Showtime's The L Word
Winnie Lopez, police officer from St. Cloud in FX Fargo
Winnie, the protagonist of Samuel Beckett's Happy Days (play)
Winnie Sanderson, Bette Midler's character in the 1993 film Hocus Pocus

References

See also
Winnie (disambiguation)
Wenno (Winne), the first Master of the Sword-Brothers

Unisex given names
Masculine given names
Feminine given names
English unisex given names
English masculine given names
English feminine given names
Hypocorisms